Robert (Bobby) Alexander Mann (born 11 January 1974) is a Scottish former professional footballer who last played for Formartine United.

During his youth career, Mann played for St Columba U9s, West Park U10s, Fairmuir u11s to U15s and Dundee United Social Club U16s.

Mann, a defender, started his career with St Johnstone in 1991 before joining Forfar Athletic a year later. He remained with Forfar for 7 years before moving to Inverness Caledonian Thistle in 1999. He was part of the Inverness team who famously defeated Celtic in the Scottish Cup in February 2000 and he helped them reach the Scottish Premier League for the first time in season 2003–04.

Despite having reached the Premier League with Inverness, he joined fellow Premier League club Dundee. In his first season at Dens Park, Dundee were relegated to the First Division. Although he was appointed club captain, Mann became an increasingly peripheral figure for the Dark Blues during the 2006–07 season. He reached an agreement to leave Dens Park and was re-united with former boss Steve Paterson on 31 January 2007, after signing with Scottish 2nd Division side Peterhead. Mann was once again re-united with Paterson when he left Peterhead and signed for Scottish Highland League side Formartine United F.C as player/assistant manager to Paterson.

Ian McCall once said of Bobby Mann, after missing out on his signing when manager of Dundee United, "Bobby Mann is without a doubt the best distributor of a ball from defence, bar none".

Current status: Bobby is currently a taxi driver in the City of Dundee

References

External links

Living people
1974 births
Footballers from Dundee
Scottish footballers
Association football defenders
St Johnstone F.C. players
Forfar Athletic F.C. players
Inverness Caledonian Thistle F.C. players
Dundee F.C. players
Peterhead F.C. players
Scottish Premier League players
Scottish Football League players
Formartine United F.C. players